Jacob Kendall Kean (born 4 February 1991) is an English footballer who plays as a goalkeeper for Notts County, where he is also the clubs first team goalkeeper coach.

He was previously at Blackburn Rovers, appearing as their first choice keeper for both the 2012–13 and 2013–14 seasons before picking up a knee injury. He has since had loan spells with Hartlepool United, Rochdale, and Yeovil Town. Kean has played internationally for England under-20s once.

Career

Blackburn Rovers
Born in Derby, Kean started his youth career at Derby County, before moving to Blackburn Rovers towards the end of the 2008–09 season. Kean joined Hartlepool United in September 2010 in a month-long loan deal. This was later extended due to injuries to Scott Flinders and Andy Rafferty. Kean made his debut on 18 September in a 0–0 away draw with Brentford. He kept ten clean sheets during his four-month spell at Victoria Park.

Kean signed for Rochdale on loan for the entire 2011–12 season. His loan was cut short in November when Blackburn recalled him because of an injury to Paul Robinson. Kean returned to Rovers because of the injury to first-choice Paul Robinson and was back up to Mark Bunn for a few games, near to the end of the season he was permanently on the bench due to an injury to Bunn. On 13 May, he made his Premier League debut away to Chelsea in goal due to injuries to both Robinson and Bunn, this also meant both sides played second-choice goalkeepers with Ross Turnbull deputising for Petr Čech in the opposite goal. Blackburn lost the game 2–1 with goals for Chelsea scored by John Terry and Raul Meireles and Yakubu scoring for Rovers. Midway through the 2012–13 Championship season, Kean took over the starting spot from Paul Robinson, keeping three clean sheets in wins over Derby County, Bristol City and Ipswich Town, also playing a key role in Blackburn's shock 1–0 win against Arsenal in the FA Cup 5th round, keeping a clean sheet and made crucial saves that kept Blackburn in the game. Kean started the 2013–14 season as first-choice until the beginning of December when he lost his first-team place to Simon Eastwood. Kean slipped further down the pecking order in January with the return from injury of Paul Robinson, who was re-instated as number one. He was left on the sidelines for the most part of the 2014–15 season by Gary Bowyer and left the club by mutual consent on 31 July 2015. Kean joined Yeovil Town on an initial one-month loan deal on 15 September 2014. On 30 January 2015, Kean joined Oldham Athletic on loan for the remainder of the season.

Norwich City
After being released by Blackburn, Kean signed a two-year contract with newly promoted Premier League side Norwich City on 1 August 2015. He left the club by mutual consent on 18 July 2016.

Sheffield Wednesday
Following his release by Norwich, Kean joined Championship side Sheffield Wednesday. On 31 December 2016, Kean joined League Two side Mansfield Town on loan for the remainder of the season. On 5 January 2018 Kean signed for Grimsby Town on loan for the rest of the 2017–18 season. His contract was not renewed at the end of his loan spell and was released from Sheffield Wednesday.

Mansfield Town 
In December 2018, Kean re-joined Mansfield Town on a short-term deal after their first choice goalkeeper, Bobby Olejnik, suffered an injury.

Coaching career
In August 2019, at the age of 28 Kean joined Notts County as goalkeeping coach and signed on as back-up player to provide back up for Sam Slocombe and Ross Fitzsimons.

International career
Following an impressive four-month loan spell for Hartlepool United, Ray Clemence was spotted scouting Kean during a 4–0 defeat to Peterborough United, and on 9 February 2011 he played 83 minutes for Brian Eastwick's England Under-20 side during a 2–1 defeat to France at Shrewsbury Town's New Meadow.

Career statistics

References

External links

1991 births
Living people
Footballers from Derby
English footballers
Association football goalkeepers
Derby County F.C. players
Blackburn Rovers F.C. players
Hartlepool United F.C. players
Rochdale A.F.C. players
Yeovil Town F.C. players
Oldham Athletic A.F.C. players
Norwich City F.C. players
Sheffield Wednesday F.C. players
Mansfield Town F.C. players
English Football League players
Premier League players
England youth international footballers
Swindon Town F.C. players
Grimsby Town F.C. players
Notts County F.C. players